Christophe Le Friant (born 10 May 1969), better known by his stage name Bob Sinclar, is a French record producer, DJ and remixer. He is the owner of the record label Yellow Productions.

Musical career
A native of Paris, Le Friant began DJing in the 1980s under the name Chris the French Kiss. During this time he was more influenced by hip hop and jazz music and created music projects such as The Mighty Bop and Reminiscence Quartet, the latter with an ensemble of musicians and where Le Friant used the alias Desmond K.

In 1998 Le Friant adopted name of Bob Sinclar after the titular character from the 1973 film Le Magnifique. He became known for popularising the "French touch" of house music with heavy use of sampled and filtered disco strings. He describes his musical style as inspired by "peace, love, and house music".

In the 2000s, several of Sinclar's releases became international hits, being particularly popular in Europe. Some of his most popular hits include "The Beat Goes On" (2002), "Love Generation" (2005, featuring Gary "Nesta" Pine) and "World, Hold On (Children of the Sky)" (2006, featuring Steve Edwards).  In 2006, Sinclar received the TMF Award Best Dance International (Belgium), and released the song "Rock This Party (Everybody Dance Now)", which samples the 1990 C+C Music Factory's song "Gonna Make You Sweat (Everybody Dance Now)", under the label Defected Records. In 2008, Sinclar also recorded, along with Steve Edwards, "Together". In 2009, he released "Lala Song" with the band The Sugarhill Gang, a remix of the band's 1979 hit "Rapper's Delight", that was one of the very early hip hop songs and the first to hit the top 40 charts. 

In the 2010s, Sinclar became a very prolific music producer. In 2011, he released a song with Italian showgirl Raffaella Carrà called "Far l'amore", a remixed version of Carrà's 1976 song "A far l'amore comincia tu". In 2013, Sinclar released a single called "Summer Moonlight", while in 2015 he collaborated with Dawn Tallman for a track titled "Feel the Vibe". In 2016, he released the track "Someone Who Needs Me", under the label Spinnin' Records, with whom he also released a collaboration with Akon, titled "'Til the Sun Rise Up". In June 2018, he released a single called "I Believe", that was very popular, particularly in Italy and other parts of Europe. In May 2021, he collaborated with the vocalist Molly Hammar to produce the song "We Could Be Dancing".

Sinclar has produced dozens of official remixes over his long career, including those of songs by artists such as Jamiroquai, Moby, James Brown, Madonna and Rihanna.

Discography

Studio albums
 Paradise (1998)
 Champs Elysées (2000)
 III (2003)
 Western Dream (2006)
 Soundz of Freedom (2007)
 Born in 69 (2009)
 Disco Crash (2012)
 Paris by Night (2013)

See also
 List of number-one dance hits (United States)
 List of artists who reached number one on the US Dance chart
 Hello (Martin Solveig song)

References

External links

 Bob Sinclar — official site
 Bob Sinclar discography at  Discogs

1969 births
Living people
People from Bois-Colombes
French house musicians
Club DJs
French DJs
Remixers
World Music Awards winners
Electronic dance music DJs